Institutional Investment in the UK: A Review (the Myners Report) was a report to HM Treasury in March 2001 on institutional investors. It was delivered by Paul Myners.

Government was concerned that institutional investors were giving insufficient attention and resources to their holdings in non-listed companies. The report addressed this, in particular concerning pension fund trustees and fund managers.

Though some anticipated creation of public interest duties, the Report took the approach of asking whether institutional investors were acting in the best interests of their beneficiaries.

Summary

The report questions whether institutional investors in the UK are too risk averse and considers if there are any factors distorting the decision-making by institutional investors.
Back in 2001 UK pension funds were only investing 0.5% of their portfolio into venture capital, whereas the US equivalents invested 5%.

See also
 Combined Code
 Cadbury Report (1992)
 Greenbury Report (1995)
 Hampel Report (1998)
 Turnbull Report
 Higgs Report (2003)

Notes

External links
Full text of the Myners Report, Institutional Investment in the United Kingdom: A Review (2001)
The government's response, Myners Review: Institutional Investment in the UK - The Government’s response (2001)
HM Treasury's Review of Progress (2004)
HM Treasury's brief overview of progress (2004)

Corporate governance in the United Kingdom
2001 in the United Kingdom
Reports of the United Kingdom government
Reports on finance and business
Pensions in the United Kingdom